The 2019 AFC Champions League qualifying play-offs were played from 5 to 19 February 2019. A total of 27 teams competed in the qualifying play-offs to decide eight of the 32 places in the group stage of the 2019 AFC Champions League.

Teams
The following 27 teams, split into two regions (West Region and East Region), entered the qualifying play-offs, consisting of three rounds:
6 teams entered in the preliminary round 1.
13 teams entered in the preliminary round 2.
8 teams entered in the play-off round.

Format

In the qualifying play-offs, each tie was played as a single match. Extra time and penalty shoot-out were used to decide the winner if necessary (Regulations Article 9.2). The eight winners of the play-off round (four each from both West Region and East Region) advanced to the group stage to join the 24 direct entrants. All losers in each round from associations with only play-off slot entered the AFC Cup group stage.

Schedule
The schedule of each round is as follows.

Bracket

The bracket of the qualifying play-offs for each region, determined based on the association ranking of each team, with the team from the higher-ranked association hosting the match, was officially announced by the AFC prior to the group stage draw on 22 November 2018. Teams from the same association could not be placed into the same tie.

Play-off West 1
 Pakhtakor advanced to Group D.

Play-off West 2
 Al-Nassr advanced to Group A.

Play-off West 3
 Al-Rayyan advanced to Group B.

Play-off West 4
 Zob Ahan advanced to Group A.

Play-off East 1
 Ulsan Hyundai advanced to Group H.

Play-off East 2
 Shandong Luneng advanced to Group E.

Play-off East 3
 Sanfrecce Hiroshima advanced to Group F.

Play-off East 4
 Kashima Antlers advanced to Group E.

Preliminary round 1

Summary
A total of six teams played in the preliminary round 1.

|+West Region

|}

|+East Region

|}

West Region

East Region

Preliminary round 2

Summary
A total of 16 teams played in the preliminary round 2: 13 teams which entered in this round, and three winners of the preliminary round 1.

|+West Region

|}

|+East Region

|}

West Region

East Region

Play-off round

Summary
A total of 16 teams played in the play-off round: eight teams which entered in this round, and eight winners of the preliminary round 2.

|+West Region

|}

|+East Region

|}

West Region

East Region

Notes

References

External links
, the-AFC.com
AFC Champions League 2019, stats.the-AFC.com

1
February 2019 sports events in Asia